Hassan Kadesh Mahboob (born 6 September 1992) is a Saudi football player who plays as a left back for Al-Taawoun. Kadesh is known for his physical strength and long passing skills.

Club career
On 9 July 2019, Al-Hilal signed Hassan with a four-year contract for 6 million riyals ($1.5 Million).

On 21 January 2020, Kadesh joined Al-Taawoun on a three-and-a-half-year contract.

International career
He captained the Saudi Arabia national Under-21 team for two years and then joined the Saudi Arabia Olympic Team.

Honours
Al-Ettifaq
 First Division: 2015–16

Al-Hilal
 Pro League: 2017–18
 Saudi Super Cup: 2018
 AFC Champions League: 2019

References

External links 
 

1992 births
Living people
People from Dammam
Saudi Arabian footballers
Ettifaq FC players
Al Hilal SFC players
Al-Taawoun FC players
Saudi First Division League players
Saudi Professional League players
Saudi Arabia international footballers
Association football fullbacks